Raman Vijayan (born 4 June 1973) is a former Indian football player, founder of Noble Football Academy And RamanVijayan Soccer School. Who currently assistant coach of Indian Super League club Chennaiyin FC.

Raman is one of two Indian footballers, other than Baichung Bhutia, to be the top scorer in the old National Football League after he scored 10 goals during the 1997–98 season.

Club career
Raman started his footballing career with East Bengal FC before the National Football League began in 1996. After the 1997-98 season, Raman became the top scorer in the NFL that season after he scored 10 goals.

Later in his career, he went on to play for CPT in the Calcutta Football League.

International
Raman has represented the India national football team during his playing career.

Coaching career
For the 2012 I-League 2nd Division Raman was hired to coach Bangalore side KGF Academy.

After coaching South United, Vijayan went back to Tamil Nadu to coach Chennai FC.

In July 2015, it was announced that Vijayan would become the assistant coach at Indian Super League side Delhi Dynamos. He would also be the technical director of the team's grassroots program.

Honours

India
SAFF Championship: 1997
 South Asian Games Bronze medal: 1999

Bengal
Santosh Trophy: 1996–97, 1998–99

East Bengal
Federation Cup: 1996

Individual
 National Football League (India) Golden Boot: 1997–98

References

1977 births
Living people
Indian footballers
India international footballers
Footballers at the 1998 Asian Games
Footballers from Tamil Nadu
Association football forwards
Asian Games competitors for India
FC Kochin players
South Asian Games medalists in football
South Asian Games bronze medalists for India